Başağaç is a village in the Savur District of Mardin Province in Turkey. The village is populated by Kurds of the Dereverî tribe and had a population of 192 in 2021.

References 

Villages in Savur District
Kurdish settlements in Mardin Province